Deuterarcha flavalis is a moth of the family Crambidae described by George Hampson in 1893.

Hampson described the species as:

References

Moths described in 1893
Spilomelinae